This is a list of all cricketers who have played first-class or List A cricket for West Zone cricket team.

Last updated at the end of the 2015/16 season.

A–F

 Iqbal Abdulla
 Hemu Adhikari
 Sudhakar Adhikari
 Ajit Agarkar
 Saeed Ahmed
 Khagesh Amin
 Amir Elahi
 Salil Ankola
 Kaushik Aphale
 Madhav Apte
 Tushar Arothe
 Harmeet Singh Baddhan
 Sairaj Bahutule
 Jaswant Bakrania
 Subhash Bandiwadekar
 Ankit Bawne
 Atul Bedade
 Rajendra Bhalekar
 Bhargav Bhatt
 Prakash Bhatt
 Surendra Bhave
 Ajit Bhoite
 Vijay Bhosle
 Chandu Borde
 Ramesh Borde
 Kiran Brahmabhatt
 Valmik Buch
 Jasprit Bumrah
 Pheroze Cambhatta
 Raghunath Chandorkar
 Ishwar Chaudhary
 Bhushan Chauhan
 Chetan Chauhan
 Kedar Chavan
 Siddharth Chitnis
 Akash Christian
 Dharmendra Chudasama
 Nari Contractor
 Madhav Dalvi
 Kirat Damani
 Amit Dani
 Bal Dani
 Randolf Daniel
 Akshay Darekar
 Sharad Deodhar
 Pravin Desai
 Ramakant Desai
 Kedar Devdhar
 Sayajirao Dhanawade
 Rakesh Dhruve
 Sameer Dighe
 Ajay Divecha
 Sharad Diwadkar
 Gregory D'Monte
 Shaukat Dudha
 Farokh Engineer
 Samad Fallah
 Tony Fernandes

G–L

 Anshuman Gaekwad
 Datta Gaekwad
 Fatehsinghrao Gaekwad
 Sangramsinh Gaekwad
 Rajesh Garsondia
 Sunil Gavaskar
 Karsan Ghavri
 Jayasinghrao Ghorpade
 Jayendrasinh Ghorpade
 Niranjan Godbole
 Sunil Gudge
 Gul Mohammad
 Milind Gunjal
 Baloo Gupte
 Madhukar Gupte
 Shishir Hattangadi
 Saeed Hatteea
 Ranjit Hazare
 Sharad Hazare
 Sanjay Hazare
 Vijay Hazare
 Dattaram Hindlekar
 Deepak Hooda
 K. C. Ibrahim
 Kumar Indrajitsinhji
 Abdul Ismail
 Sheldon Jackson
 Bimal Jadeja
 Ravindra Jadeja
 Rajendra Jadeja
 Dheeraj Jadhav
 Kedar Jadhav
 Rohit Jadhav
 Shrikant Jadhav
 Wasim Jaffer
 Chirag Jani
 Santosh Jedhe
 Sandeep Jobanputra
 Manoj Joglekar
 Domnic Joseph
 Ashok Joshi
 Nana Joshi
 Shekhar Joshi
 Uday Joshi
 Vithal Joshi
 Manpreet Juneja
 Abhijit Kale
 Shrikant Kalyani
 Vinod Kambli
 Prasad Kanade
 Hemant Kanitkar
 Hrishikesh Kanitkar
 Pradeep Kasliwal
 Suresh Keshwala
 Harshad Khadiwale
 Azim Khan
 Zaheer Khan
 Aniruddha Kher
 Ranjit Khirid
 Hemant Kinikar
 Gogumal Kishenchand
 Sanjay Kondhalkar
 Shitanshu Kotak
 Sahil Kukreja
 Dhawal Kulkarni
 Milind Kulkarni
 Nilesh Kulkarni
 Raju Kulkarni
 Ravi Kulkarni
 Sulakshan Kulkarni
 Umesh Kulkarni
 Abey Kuruvilla
 Anil Lashkari

M–R

 Ebrahim Maka
 Ashraf Makda
 Kamlesh Makvana
 Shridhar Mandale
 Vinayak Mane
 Sandip Maniar
 Sanjay Manjrekar
 Vijay Manjrekar
 Ashok Mankad
 Chetan Mankad
 Rahul Mankad
 Vinoo Mankad
 Madhav Mantri
 Jacob Martin
 Marutirao Mathe
 Atul Mehta
 Bhavin Mehta
 Niranjan Mehta
 Altaf Merchant
 Uday Merchant
 Vijay Merchant
 Milip Mewada
 Paras Mhambrey
 Bharat Mistry
 Nilesh Modi
 Rusi Modi
 Sadanand Mohol
 Kiran Mokashi
 Nayan Mongia
 Kiran More
 Robin Morris
 Rohit Motwani
 Shrikant Mundhe
 Amol Muzumdar
 Bapu Nadkarni
 Ramesh Nagdev
 Ajit Naik
 Sudhir Naik
 Dinesh Nanavati
 Mukesh Narula
 Suru Nayak
 Abhishek Nayar
 B. B. Nimbalkar
 Raosaheb Nimbalkar
 Shah Nyalchand
 Sham Oak
 Jayesh Odedra
 Nilesh Odedra
 Jayantilal Oza
 Ajit Pai
 A. J. Panchasara
 Chandrakant Pandit
 Atul Pandya
 Rishikesh Parab
 Satyajit Parab
 Jatin Paranjpe
 Dashrat Pardeshi
 Rakesh Parikh
 Ghulam Parkar
 Ramnath Parkar
 Zulfiqar Parkar
 Monish Parmar
 Mukund Parmar
 Dhiraj Parsana
 Hitesh Parsana
 Naresh Parsana
 Ashok Patel
 Axar Patel
 Jasu Patel
 Jayaprakash Patel
 Lalit Patel
 Munaf Patel
 Niraj Patel
 Parthiv Patel
 Pathik Patel
 Rakesh Patel
 Rashid Patel
 Smit Patel
 Chirag Pathak
 Irfan Pathan
 Irfan Pathan
 Yusuf Pathan
 Jitendra Patil
 Sandeep Patil
 Sadashiv Patil
 Sanjay Patil
 Kaustubh Pawar
 Rajesh Pawar
 Dattu Phadkar
 Riaz Poonawala
 Kiran Powar
 Krishnajirao Powar
 Ramesh Powar
 Prasad Pradhan
 Cheteshwar Pujara
 Pananmal Punjabi
 Bhavin Radia
 Ajinkya Rahane
 Madan Raiji
 Lalchand Rajput
 Gulabrai Ramchand
 Khandu Rangnekar
 Subash Ranjane
 Vasant Ranjane
 Ranvirsinhji
 Ambati Rayudu
 Milind Rege
 Madhusudan Rege

S–Z

 Stanley Saldanha
 Pandurang Salgaoncar
 Aavishkar Salvi
 Balwinder Sandhu
 Jignesh Sanghani
 Dilip Sardesai
 Narayan Satham
 Santosh Saxena
 Harshad Shah
 Hiken Shah
 Pinal Shah
 Anwar Shaikh
 Rohit Sharma
 Ravi Shastri
 Shatrusalyasinhji
 Sher Mohammad
 Nishit Shetty
 Vijay Shetty
 Sadashiv Shinde
 Padmakar Shivalkar
 Deepak Shodhan
 Amit Shroff
 Iqbal Siddiqui
 Yeshwant Sidhaye
 Ranga Sohoni
 Rakesh Solanki
 Eknath Solkar
 Charlie Stayers
 Shantanu Sugwekar
 Sukhbir Singh
 Rusi Surti
 Rajesh Sutar
 R. A. Swaroop
 Suhas Talim
 Rakesh Tandon
 Keki Tarapore
 Aditya Tare
 Sachin Tendulkar
 Bhavik Thaker
 Ravindra Thakkar
 Shardul Thakur
 Siddharth Trivedi
 Siddharth Trivedi
 Polly Umrigar
 Jaydev Unadkat
 Murtuja Vahora
 Arun Varde
 Tejas Varsani
 Arpit Vasavada
 Dilip Vengsarkar
 Yalaka Venugopal Rao
 Jyotirvandan Vin
 Ajit Wadekar
 Vinit Wadkar
 Aditya Waghmode
 Yogendra Wakaskar
 Connor Williams
 Suryakumar Yadav
 Yajurvindra Singh
 Ravindra Yerawadekar
 Mohamed Zahid
 Avadhut Zarapkar
 Joy Zinto
 Vijay Zol

References

West Zone cricketers